The Wales national football team represents Wales in international football. It is controlled by the Football Association of Wales (FAW), the governing body for football in Wales. They have been a member of FIFA since 1946 and a member of UEFA since 1954.

The team has qualified for the FIFA World Cup twice, in 1958 and 2022. In 1958, they reached the quarter-finals before losing to eventual champions Brazil. They then went 58 years before reaching their second major tournament, when – following a rise of 109 places from an all-time low of 117th to a peak of 8th in the FIFA World Rankings between August 2011 and October 2015 – they qualified for UEFA Euro 2016, where they reached the semi-finals before again losing to the eventual champions, Portugal. A second successive UEFA European Championship followed when Wales reached the round of 16 of UEFA Euro 2020. They also progressed through UEFA Euro 1976 qualifying to the quarter-finals, though this was played on a two-legged, home-and-away basis and is not considered part of the finals tournament.

Historically, the Welsh team has featured a number of players from Wales' top club teams, Cardiff City and Swansea City. These two Welsh clubs play in the English league system alongside fellow Welsh clubs Newport County, Wrexham and Merthyr Town. However, most Welsh football clubs play in the Welsh football league system. Wales, as a country of the United Kingdom, is not a member of the International Olympic Committee and therefore the national team does not compete in the Olympic Games.

History

The early years

Wales played its first competitive match on 25 March 1876 against Scotland in Glasgow, making it the third-oldest international football team in the world. Although the Scots won the first fixture 4–0, a return match was planned in Wales the following year, and so it was that the first international football match on Welsh soil took place at the Racecourse Ground, Wrexham, on 5 March 1877. Scotland took the spoils winning 2–0. Wales' first match against England came in 1879, a 2–1 defeat at the Kennington Oval, London, and in 1882, Wales faced Ireland for the first time, winning 7–1 in Wrexham.

The associations of the four Home Nations met at the International Football Conference in Manchester on 6 December 1882 to set down a set of worldwide rules. This meeting saw the establishment of the International Football Association Board (IFAB) to approve changes to the rules, a task the four associations still perform to this day. The 1883–84 season saw the formation of the British Home Championship, a tournament which was played annually between England, Scotland, Ireland and Wales, until 1983–84. Wales were champions on 12 occasions, winning outright seven times whilst sharing the title five times.

The FAW became members of FIFA, world football's governing body, in 1910, but the relationship between FIFA and the British associations was fraught and the British nations withdrew from FIFA in 1928 in a dispute over payments to amateur players. As a result, Wales did not enter the first three FIFA World Cups. In 1932, Wales played host to the Republic of Ireland, the first time they played against a side from outside the four home nations. One year later, Wales played a match outside the United Kingdom for the first time when they travelled to Paris to play France national football team in a match drawn 1–1. After World War II, Wales, along with the other three home nations, rejoined FIFA in 1946 and took part in the qualifying rounds for the 1950 World Cup, the 1949–50 Home Championships being designated as a qualifying group. The top two teams were to qualify for the finals in Brazil, but Wales finished bottom of the group.

1958 World Cup

The 1950s were a golden age for Welsh football with stars such as Ivor Allchurch, Cliff Jones, Alf Sherwood, Jack Kelsey, Trevor Ford, Ronnie Burgess, Terry Medwin and John Charles.

Wales made their first World Cup finals tournament appearance in the 1958 edition in Sweden. However, their path to qualification was unusual. Having finished second to Czechoslovakia in qualifying Group 4, the golden generation of Welsh football managed by Jimmy Murphy seemed to have missed out on qualification, but the politics of the Middle East subsequently intervened. In the Asian/African qualifying zone, Egypt and Sudan had refused to play against Israel following the Suez crisis, while Indonesia had insisted on meeting Israel on neutral ground. As a result, FIFA proclaimed Israel winners of their group. However, FIFA did not want a team to qualify for the World Cup finals without actually playing a match, and so lots were drawn of all the second-placed teams in UEFA. Belgium were drawn out first but refused to participate, and so then Wales was drawn out and awarded a two-legged play-off match against Israel with a place in Sweden for the winners. Having defeated Israel 2–0 at the Ramat Gan Stadium and 2–0 at Ninian Park, Cardiff, Wales went through to a World Cup finals tournament for the first time.

The strong Welsh squad made their mark in Sweden, drawing all the matches in their group against Hungary, Mexico and Sweden before defeating Hungary in a play-off match to reach the quarter-finals against Brazil. However, Wales' chances of victory against Brazil were hampered by an injury to John Charles that ruled him out of the match. Wales lost 1–0 with 17-year-old Pelé scoring his first international goal. The goal made Pelé the youngest World Cup goalscorer and Brazil went on to win the tournament.

Wales' remarkable campaign in Sweden was the subject of the best-selling book When Pele Broke Our Hearts: Wales and the 1958 World Cup (by Mario Risoli, St David's Press) which was published on the 40th anniversary of the World Cup and was also the inspiration for a Bafta Cymru-nominated documentary.

1970s
Wales failed to qualify for the first four finals tournaments of the UEFA European Championship from its inception in 1960. They also did not replicate their success in qualifying for the 1958 FIFA World Cup, although they did achieve a highly creditable draw against then world champions England in the 1970 British Home Championship, weeks before England went to defend their title in Mexico 1970 FIFA World Cup. This helped to give Wales a share of the Home Championship trophy for the year, goal difference not at that stage being used to determine an outright winner. In 1976, the team – managed by Mike Smith – reached the quarter-finals of the UEFA European Championship, having finished top of qualifying Group 2 ahead of Hungary, Austria and Luxembourg, but this was not considered part of the finals. Prior to 1980, only four countries qualified for the finals tournament, and Wales were drawn to play against the winners of Group 3 – Yugoslavia – in a two-legged, home-and-away tie. Wales lost the first leg 2–0 in Zagreb and were eliminated from the competition following a 1–1 draw in a bad-tempered return leg at Cardiff's Ninian Park, which was marred by crowd trouble. This initially led to Wales being banned from the 1980 tournament, but this was reduced on appeal to a four-year ban on qualifying matches being played within 100 miles of Cardiff. Yugoslavia went on to finish fourth in the 1976 tournament.

The following year, Wales defeated England on English soil for the first time in 42 years and secured their only victory to date at Wembley Stadium thanks to a Leighton James penalty. Wales went onto finish second in the 1977 British Home Championship. A few weeks earlier, Wales achieved another noted victory against then European Champions Czechoslovakia with Nick Deacy and James again scoring. This victory in a qualifier strengthened Wales' bid to qualify for the 1978 FIFA World Cup, but six months later, that attempt ended in controversial circumstances. The decisive fixture against Scotland - nominally a home fixture for Wales, although relocated to Anfield amidst security concerns - was swung by a contentious penalty awarded to Scotland, replays suggesting the handball offence may have actually been perpetrated by Scottish striker Joe Jordan. Another notable achievement for Wales however came in the 1980 British Home Championship, as Wales comprehensively defeated England at the Racecourse Ground. Goals from Mickey Thomas, Ian Walsh, Leighton James and an own goal by Phil Thompson saw Wales defeat England 4–1 just four days after England had defeated the then-world champions, Argentina.

1980s
In the 1982 FIFA World Cup qualifiers, the Wales team – managed by Mike England – came extremely close to qualification; a 3–0 defeat against the Soviet Union in their final match meant they missed out on goal difference, but the real damage had been done by their failure to beat Iceland in their last home match, the match eventually finishing 2–2 after several hold-ups due to floodlight failures.

Wales also only narrowly missed out on qualification for the 1984 UEFA European Championship. They were minutes away from qualification when a winning goal by Ljubomir Radanović for Yugoslavia in the final game of qualifying group 4 against Bulgaria eliminated Wales.

Mark Hughes marked his debut for Wales by scoring the only goal of the match as England were defeated once again in 1984. The following season, Hughes was again on target, scoring a wonder goal as Wales thrashed Spain 3–0 at the Racecourse during qualification for the 1986 World Cup. However, despite defeating Scotland 1–0 at Hampden Park, it was again Iceland that wrecked Welsh hopes by defeating Wales 1–0 in Reykjavík, and for the second World Cup in a row, Wales missed out on goal difference. Wales had to win their last match at home to Scotland to be guaranteed at least a play-off, but were held to a 1–1 draw in a match marred by the death of Scotland manager Jock Stein, who collapsed from a heart attack at the end of the match.

Wales also started strongly in their bid to qualify for the 1988 UEFA European Championship, and were undefeated after four games. But away defeats against Denmark and Czechoslovakia in the last two games in qualifying group 6 saw Mike England's eight-year reign as Welsh coach end in another disappointment.

1990s
Under coach Terry Yorath, Wales achieved a remarkable result on 5 June 1991 when defeating then world champions Germany in a Euro 1992 qualifier, thanks to a goal from Ian Rush. Three months later, on 11 September 1991, Wales achieved a notable double by defeating Brazil for the only time in a friendly international, thanks to a goal from Dean Saunders. At this point, Wales seemed well placed to progress from their qualifying group 5. However, victories for Germany in their three remaining matches in the group, including a 4–1 win in the return fixture against Wales, eliminated the Welsh.

Wales also made a strong showing in their qualifying group for the 1994 World Cup, achieving a noted victory at home to Belgium. Wales thus attained what was then their highest position in the FIFA World Rankings on 27 August 1993. Wales again came close to qualifying for a major championship only to fall short in the closing stages of their campaign. Needing to win the final match of the group at home to Romania, Paul Bodin missed a penalty when the scores were level 1–1; the miss was immediately followed by Romania taking the lead and going on to win 2–1.

Following the failure to qualify, Yorath's contract as manager of the national side was not renewed by the FAW, and Real Sociedad manager John Toshack was appointed on a part-time basis. However, Toshack resigned after just one match (a 3–1 defeat to Norway) citing problems with the FAW as his reason for leaving, although he was sure to have been shocked at being booed off the pitch at Ninian Park by the Welsh fans still reeling from the dismissal of Yorath. Mike Smith took the manager role for the second time at the start of the Euro 1996 qualifiers, but Wales slipped to embarrassing defeats against Moldova and Georgia before Bobby Gould was appointed in June 1995.

Gould's time in charge of Wales is seen as a dark period by Welsh football fans. His questionable tactics and public fallings-out with players Nathan Blake, Robbie Savage and Mark Hughes, coupled with embarrassing defeats to club side Leyton Orient and a 7–1 thrashing by the Netherlands in 1996 did not make him a popular figure within Wales. Gould finally resigned following a 4–0 defeat to Italy in 1999, and the FAW turned to two legends of the national team, Neville Southall and Mark Hughes, to take temporary charge of the match against Denmark four days later, with Hughes later being appointed on a permanent basis.

2000s
Under Mark Hughes, Wales came close to qualifying for a place at Euro 2004 in Portugal, being narrowly defeated by Russia in the play-offs. However, the defeat was not without its controversy, as Russian midfielder Yegor Titov tested positive for the use of a banned substance after the first qualifying leg, a scoreless draw in Moscow. Notwithstanding, FIFA opted not to take action against the Football Union of Russia other than instructing them not to field Titov again, and the Russian team went on to defeat Wales 1–0 in Cardiff to qualify for the final tournament.

Following a disappointing start to 2006 FIFA World Cup qualification – UEFA Group 6, Hughes left his role with the national team to take over as manager of English Premier League outfit Blackburn Rovers. On 12 November 2004, John Toshack was appointed manager for the second time.

In Euro 2008 qualifying, Wales were drawn in Group D alongside Germany, the Czech Republic, Slovakia, the Republic of Ireland, Cyprus and San Marino. The team's performance was disappointing, finishing fifth in the group with expected defeat at home to Germany yet an unexpected draw away, a loss away and a goalless draw at home to the Czech Republic, a loss away and 2–2 draw at home to the Republic of Ireland, a 3–0 home win and uninspiring 2–1 away win against minnows San Marino, a 3–1 home win and 3–1 away defeat against Cyprus, and a spectacularly mixed performance against Slovakia, losing 5–1 at home and winning 5–2 away. However, better performances towards the end of the competition by a team containing – of necessity because of injuries and suspensions of senior players – five players who were eligible for selection for the under-21 squad was viewed as a hopeful sign of future progress for the team.

In 2010 FIFA World Cup qualification – UEFA Group 4, Wales made a promising start, winning 1–0 and 2–0 against Azerbaijan and Liechtenstein, respectively. However, they lost their next match against Russia in Moscow, 2–1, after Joe Ledley had briefly drawn them level. The qualifying campaign showed signs of promise when the team managed to prevent Germany from scoring for 74 minutes of their match in Mönchengladbach, although Wales ultimately lost 1–0. Two 2–0 home defeats by Finland and Germany in Spring 2009 effectively put paid to Wales' hopes of qualification.

Wales were drawn in UEFA Euro 2012 qualifying Group G with Montenegro, Bulgaria, Switzerland and close rivals England. Wales lost 1–0 away to Montenegro in their opening match and, on 9 September 2010, John Toshack stood down as manager after being disappointed at previous results in 2010 against Croatia and the opening Euro 2012 qualifier.

Wales under-21 coach Brian Flynn took over from Toshack as caretaker manager with a view to a possible permanent appointment, but a 1–0 home defeat to Bulgaria and 4–1 away loss to Switzerland prompted the FAW to pass over Flynn.

2010s

Gary Speed was appointed as permanent manager on 14 December 2010. Speed's first match as manager was 8 February 2011 in the inaugural Nations Cup, which the Republic of Ireland won 3–0. Speed's first competitive match was the Euro 2012 qualifier at home to England on 26 March 2011, and Speed appointed 20-year-old Aaron Ramsey captain, making him the youngest Wales captain. Wales lost to England 2–0 and in August 2011 Wales attained their lowest FIFA ranking of 117th. This was followed by a 2–1 home win against Montenegro, a 1–0 away loss to England, a 2–0 home win against Switzerland and a 1–0 away win against Bulgaria. Consequently, in October 2011, Wales had rapidly risen to 45th in the FIFA rankings. A 4–1 home win in a friendly match against Norway on 12 November 2011 proved to be Speed's last match in charge of Wales. The match was a culmination of Speed's efforts which led Wales to receive the unofficial award for biggest mover of 2011 in the FIFA rankings. His tenure as manager ended in tragic circumstances two weeks later when he was found dead at his home on 27 November, having apparently committed suicide.

Due to London's successful bid for the 2012 Summer Olympics, a Great Britain team would qualify as of right of being the host nation. However, the FAW stressed it was strongly against the proposal. Despite this, Welsh players Aaron Ramsey and Gareth Bale expressed their interest in representing the Great Britain Olympic football team. Bale controversially withdrew due to injury, but Ramsey was joined by four other Welshmen in Stuart Pearce's 18-man squad: Swansea City's Joe Allen and Neil Taylor, while Manchester United's Ryan Giggs and Liverpool's Craig Bellamy were included as over-age players, with Giggs being made captain.

Chris Coleman was appointed Wales team manager on 19 January 2012. For 2014 World Cup qualification, Wales were drawn in Group A with Croatia, Serbia, Belgium, Scotland and Macedonia. They lost their first match 2–0, against Belgium. Their second match, against Serbia, was even worse, finishing 6–1, Wales's worst defeat since the 7–1 reversal to the Netherlands in 1996. In October 2012, Ashley Williams was appointed captain of Wales by Coleman, replacing Aaron Ramsey. Wales won at home against Scotland 2–1, lost away to Croatia 2–0 and won away against Scotland 2–1, but a 2–1 loss at home to Croatia ended Wales hopes of qualifying.

Wales were placed in Group B for qualifying for Euro 2016 alongside Andorra, Belgium, Bosnia and Herzegovina, Cyprus and Israel. In July 2015, following four wins and two draws, Wales topped the group.

In July 2015, having attained their then highest FIFA ranking of tenth, Wales were placed among the top seeds for the 2018 FIFA World Cup qualification draw. Wales were drawn in Group D with Austria, Serbia, the Republic of Ireland, Moldova and Georgia.

In September 2015, England dropped to tenth in the FIFA rankings, making Wales – in ninth position – the highest-ranked British team for the first time in its history. In October 2015, Wales attained their highest ever FIFA ranking of eighth. On 10 October 2015, Wales lost 2–0 to Bosnia and Herzegovina. However, Wales' qualification for Euro 2016 was confirmed after Cyprus defeated Israel that same evening.

Euro 2016
Wales qualified for Euro 2016 in France, their first European Championship tournament, and were drawn into Group B with Slovakia, Russia and England. On their Euro debut, on 11 June against Slovakia at the Nouveau Stade de Bordeaux, Gareth Bale scored direct from a free-kick to give Wales a 1–0 lead, and Hal Robson-Kanu scored the winner in a 2–1 victory that put them top of the group. In their second match, against England in Lens, Wales led 1–0 at half-time through another Bale free-kick, but lost 2–1. Against Russia at the Stadium Municipal in Toulouse, Aaron Ramsey, Neil Taylor and Bale scored in a 3–0 win that made them win the group.

In their round of 16 match at the Parc des Princes in Paris, Wales played Northern Ireland and won 1–0 after Bale's cross was put in as an own goal by Gareth McAuley. In the quarter-final against Belgium, Wales went behind to a long-range effort from Radja Nainggolan, but captain Ashley Williams headed an equaliser before Hal Robson-Kanu and Sam Vokes confirmed a 3–1 victory for Wales. This victory advanced Wales to their first major tournament semi-final and also made them the first British nation to advance to the semi-finals of a major tournament since England did so at Euro 1996 as hosts.

The first half of the semi-final against Portugal in Lyon went goalless, but goals from Cristiano Ronaldo and Nani early in the second half saw Portugal claim a 2–0 win. Wales were welcomed back home on 8 July with an open-top bus parade around Cardiff, starting at Cardiff Castle and going past the Millennium Stadium before finishing at the Cardiff City Stadium.

2018 World Cup qualification
In September 2016, Wales opened their 2018 World Cup qualification campaign with a comfortable 4–0 home win against Moldova. However, they followed this with a run of five consecutive draws away to Austria, at home to Georgia, both home and away against Serbia and away to the Republic of Ireland. That run came to an end with a 1–0 home victory over Austria on 2 September 2017, followed by a 2–0 away victory against Moldova on 5 September and a 1–0 away win over Georgia on 6 October. Wales finished third in their group due to a 1–0 loss to the Republic of Ireland on 9 October and failed to qualify for the 2018 FIFA World Cup play-offs. Chris Coleman resigned as Wales team manager on 17 November 2017 and was appointed team manager at Sunderland.

Euro 2020 & Nations League
After nearly two months of managerial vacancy, former Wales national player Ryan Giggs was named Wales' new manager on 19 June 2018. Giggs, who signed a four-year contract, led Wales for the 2018–19 UEFA Nations League campaign and Euro 2020 qualification. Despite losing two of the first three qualifiers for UEFA Euro 2020, Wales went unbeaten in the second half of 2019 and ultimately qualified in second place following a 2–0 win over Hungary in their final match on 19 November.

Euro 2020 was delayed until 2021 by the COVID-19 pandemic in Europe, which meant Wales' next games came in the 2020–21 UEFA Nations League. They kept five consecutive clean sheets on the way to an unbeaten record in the competition, winning five games and drawing one, despite Giggs not being available for the last two games due to legal troubles. With Rob Page in interim charge, the team beat Finland 3–1 in their final match to finish top of the group and gain promotion to League A for the 2022–23 UEFA Nations League.

UEFA Euro 2020 was played in June/July 2021 with matches spread across 11 host countries throughout Europe for the first time, rather than hosted by a single country. Consequently, the Wales Group A matches against Switzerland and Turkey were held in Baku, Azerbaijan and then against Italy in Rome. Under Page as interim manager, Wales progressed from the group stage after finishing second in the group to Italy, the eventual tournament winners. In the last 16 round Wales lost to Denmark in Amsterdam.

2022 World Cup, Nations League & Euro 2024

For 2022 World Cup qualification Wales were drawn in Group E with Belgium, Czech Republic, Belarus and Estonia with Page again acting as interim manager for the matches in 2021 and 2022. Wales finished second in Group E and progressed to the qualification play-off stage. 

The song Yma o Hyd was sung live by Dafydd Iwan before kick off of the penultimate game of the FIFA World Cup qualifying campaign against Austria with Wales winning 2-1. After beating Austria in the play-off semi-final, Wales qualified for the World Cup for the first time since 1958 with a 1–0 win over Ukraine at the Cardiff City Stadium on 5 June 2022. Yma o Hyd was again sang before the match and Gareth Bale, the Wales captain, also led the team in singing along with Iwan after the final whistle. For the 2022 World Cup in Qatar, Wales were drawn in Group B with England, Iran and the United States.

Following their promotion in the previous Nations League campaign, Wales were drawn in Group A4 of the 2022–23 UEFA Nations League along with Belgium, the Netherlands and Poland, with Rob Page still interim manager.

On 20 June 2022, Ryan Giggs resigned as Wales manager due to his upcoming court case. Page stayed on as interim manager before being given a four-year contract extension in September 2022, managing Wales at the 2022 World Cup in Qatar. Their performance in their opening match against the United States led to an eventual 1-1 draw, after Bale scored from a penalty kick. Their second match against Iran saw goalkeeper Wayne Hennessey sent off for a reckless challenge on Iran's Mehdi Taremi; Iran then scored twice in injury time to give Wales a 2–0 defeat. In their last ditch effort in hopes of making it to the Round of 16, they faced off against neighbouring nation England. England won the game 3–0, hence Wales finished bottom of Group B and were eliminated from the tournament. On 9 January 2023 Wales captain Gareth Bale retired from club and international football. At the time of his retirement he was the record goal scorer and record cap holder for the Welsh team. Aaron Ramsey was subsequently appointed Wales captain.

Wales were drawn in UEFA Euro 2024 qualifying Group D with Croatia, Armenia, Turkey and Latvia.

Team image

Media coverage
Live television broadcast rights are held by S4C (Welsh language commentary) and Sky Sports (English language commentary) until 2022.

Colours and logo
 
The primary kit has long been all-red. The crest of the Football Association of Wales features a rampant Welsh Dragon on a white shield. From 1920, the shield was surrounded by a red border, and the letters 'FAW' were added in 1926. The badge was redesigned in 1951, adding a green border with 11 daffodils, as well as the Welsh-language motto Gorau Chwarae Cyd Chwarae ("The best play is team play"). The motto was briefly removed in 1984, but the badge stayed largely the same until 2010, when the shield was changed to feature rounded sides and the motto banner was changed from white to red and green. The dragon also changed from rampant to rampant regardant. The motto was removed again in 2019, following another major redesign of the badge, which saw the top of the shield flattened and the sides changed not to curve outwards; the green border was also thinned and the daffodils removed.

Kit supplier

Name

In October 2022, the FAW announced it was considering rebranding the team to only use the Welsh name for the country, ditching the term "Wales", following the 2022 FIFA World Cup. The suggestion was stated by University of Limerick professor Owen Worth, to be an example of the connection between the team's supporters' clubs and pro-Welsh independence groups such as Yes Cymru and AUOB Cymru.

Home stadium

From 2000 to 2009, Wales played most of their home matches at the Millennium Stadium, Cardiff. The stadium was built in 1999 on the site of the old National Stadium, known as Cardiff Arms Park, as the Welsh Rugby Union (WRU) had been chosen to host the 1999 Rugby World Cup. Prior to 1989, Wales played their home games at the grounds of Cardiff City, Swansea City and Wrexham, but then came to an agreement with the WRU to use Cardiff Arms Park and, subsequently, the Millennium Stadium.

Wales' first football match at the Millennium Stadium was against Finland on 29 March 2000. The Finns won the match 2–1, with Jari Litmanen becoming the first player to score a goal at the stadium. Ryan Giggs scored Wales' goal in the match, becoming the first Welshman to score at the stadium.

With the opening of the Cardiff City Stadium in 2009, the FAW chose to stage most home friendlies there, with other friendly matches played at the Liberty Stadium in Swansea (now known as the Swansea.com Stadium) and the Racecourse Ground in Wrexham. Qualifying matches continued to be played at the 74,500-capacity Millennium Stadium until the end of 2009, which was typically only around 20–40% full amid poor team results. This led to calls from fans and players for international matches to be held at smaller stadiums. For the Euro 2012 qualifying campaign, the FAW decided Wales would play all of their home matches at either the Cardiff City Stadium or the Liberty Stadium, with the exception of the home tie against England, which was played at the Millennium Stadium. The 2014 World Cup qualifying campaign saw four home matches at the Cardiff City Stadium and one at the Liberty Stadium. Cardiff City Stadium's capacity was increased to 33,000 in 2014 and all home matches for Euro 2016 qualifying were scheduled at the stadium and Wales subsequently qualified for the finals tournament in France. All five home qualifiers for the 2018 FIFA World Cup were held at the stadium as well as both of the team's home 2018–19 UEFA Nations League games. All home games in the Euro 2020 qualifying campaign also took place there. A friendly against Spain was played at the Millennium Stadium on 11 October 2018, which was Wales' first match at the stadium in just over seven-and-a-half years, finishing in a 4–1 defeat. On 20 March 2019, Wales played a friendly against Trinidad and Tobago at the Racecourse Ground, their first match there since 2008.

Results and fixtures

The following is a list of match results from the previous 12 months, as well as any future matches that have been scheduled.

2022

2023

Current coaching staff

Coaching history

Caretaker manager are listed in italics.
Prior to 1954 the Welsh team was chosen by a panel of selectors with the team captain fulfilling the role of coach.

  Walley Barnes (1954–1955)
  Jimmy Murphy (1956–1964)
  Dave Bowen (1964–1974)
  Ron Burgess (1965)
  Mike Smith (1974–1979)
  Mike England (1979–1987)
  David Williams (1988)
  Terry Yorath (1988–1993)
  John Toshack (1994)
  Mike Smith (1994–1995)
  Bobby Gould (1995–1999)
  Neville Southall (1999)
  Mark Hughes (1999–2004)
  John Toshack (2004–2010)
  Brian Flynn (2010)
  Gary Speed (2010–2011)
  Chris Coleman (2012–2017)
  Ryan Giggs (2018–2022)
  Rob Page (2020–Present)

Players

Current squad
Wales named their 24-man squad for the UEFA Euro 2024 Qualifiers against Croatia on 25 March and Latvia on 28 March 2023.

Caps and goals are correct as of 29 November 2022, after the match against England.

Recent call-ups
The following players have been called up for the team within the last 12 months.

 PRE

INJ Withdrew due to injury
WD Withdrew from the squad due to non-injury issue
SUS Serving suspension
RET Retired from the national team
PRE Preliminary squad / standby

Individual records

Players in bold are still active with Wales.

Most appearances

Most goals

Notable former players
Welsh Sports Hall of Fame inductees
 Ivor Allchurch
 Horace Blew
 Ronnie Burgess
 John Charles
 Trevor Ford
 Ryan Giggs
 Mark Hughes
 Bryn Jones
 Cliff Jones
 Fred Keenor
 Jack Kelsey
 George Latham
 Billy Meredith
 Jimmy Murphy
 Ivor Powell
 Ian Rush
 Alf Sherwood
 Neville Southall
 Gary Speed
 John Toshack
 Terry Yorath

Welsh inductees to the English Football Hall of Fame
 2002 – John Charles
 2005 – Ryan Giggs
 2006 – Ian Rush
 2007 – Mark Hughes, Billy Meredith
 2013 – Cliff Jones
 2015 – Ivor Allchurch
 2016 – Neville Southall
 2017 – Gary Speed

Welsh inductees to the Football League 100 Legends
 Ivor Allchurch
 John Charles
 Trevor Ford
 Ryan Giggs
 Cliff Jones
 Billy Meredith
 Ian Rush
 Neville Southall

Welsh winners of the FWA Footballer of the Year
 Ian Rush (1984)
 Neville Southall (1985)
 Gareth Bale (2013)

Welsh winners of the PFA Players' Player of the Year
 Ian Rush (1984)
 Mark Hughes (1989, 1991)
 Ryan Giggs (2009)
 Gareth Bale (2011, 2013)

Welsh Inductee to the PFA Team of the Year
 Leighton James (1975)
 John Toshack (1976)
 Ian Rush (1983, 1984, 1985, 1987, 1991)
 Kevin Ratcliffe (1985)
 Mark Hughes (1986, 1989, 1991, 1992)
 Neville Southall (1987, 1988, 1989, 1990)
 Gary Speed (1993)
 Ryan Giggs (1993, 1998, 2001, 2002, 2007, 2009)
 Gareth Bale (2011, 2012, 2013)

Team records
 Biggest win
 11–0 (Wrexham, Wales; 3 March 1888)

 Biggest defeat
 9–0 (Glasgow, Scotland; 23 March 1878)

Competitive record

FIFA World Cup

UEFA European Championship

 
Notes

UEFA Nations League

Major competitions
FIFA World Cup
Fifth place: 1958

UEFA European Championship
Third place: 2016

Other honours
Continental
UEFA Nations League
League B (1st): 2020–21

Regional
 British Home Championship
 Champions (12): 1906–07, 1919–20, 1923–24, 1927–28, 1932–33, 1933–34, 1936–37, 1938–39 (shared), 1951–52 (shared), 1955–56 (shared), 1959–60 (shared), 1969–70 (shared)

See also

 Wales national under-21 football team
 Wales national under-20 football team
 Wales national under-19 football team
 Wales national under-18 football team
 Wales national under-17 football team
 Wales women's national football team
 Wales women's national under-17 football team
 Wales national futsal team

References

Bibliography
 Red Dragons: The Story of Welsh Football by Phil Stead

External links

 Football Association of Wales
 Football Association of Wales Trust
 International results of Wales

Wales national football team
1876 establishments in Wales
European national association football teams